A Boy and His Dog is a 1946 American Technicolor short drama film directed by LeRoy Prinz. It won an Oscar at the 19th Academy Awards in 1947 for Best Short Subject (Two-Reel).

Short-story author Samuel A. Derieux, who died twenty-four years earlier in 1922, received story credit for the film, suggesting to some the expectation that he wrote a work with the title "A Boy and His Dog". However, a plot summary for the film, attributed to David Glagovsky, closely parallels Derieux's short story "The Trial in Tom Belcher's Store", suggesting the film-makers drew on the published (and once celebrated) story, but gave the film a title Derieux need not ever have considered.

It is entirely unrelated to Harlan Ellison's 1969 novella cycle as well as its 1975 film adaptation of the same name.

Cast
 Harry Davenport as Squire Jim Kirby
 Billy Sheffield as Davy Allen
 Dorothy Adams as Mrs. Allen
 Russell Simpson as Mr. Thornycroft
 Eddie Waller as Sheriff
 and Fleeta as Buck  [a Bluetick Coonhound]

Unbilled
Truman Bradley (narrator)
Heinie Conklin (townsman at meeting)
Jack Mower (Tom Belcher, store owner)

References

External links
 
 
 

1946 films
1946 drama films
1946 short films
American drama films
Films about dogs
Live Action Short Film Academy Award winners
Films scored by William Lava
Warner Bros. short films
Films directed by LeRoy Prinz
1940s English-language films
1940s American films